The Farmer's Daughter is a 1947 American comedy film that tells the story of a farmgirl who ends up working as a maid for a Congressman and his politically powerful mother.  It stars Loretta Young, Joseph Cotten, Ethel Barrymore, and Charles Bickford, and was adapted by Allen Rivkin and Laura Kerr from the 1937 Finnish play Juurakon Hulda by Hella Wuolijoki, using the pen name Juhani Tervapää (misspelled in the film's credits as Juhni Tervataa).  It was directed by H.C. Potter.

The film won the Academy Award for Best Actress for Loretta Young and was nominated for Best Actor in a Supporting Role for Charles Bickford. Young's win was considered an upset; everyone had expected Rosalind Russell to win for her Lavinia in Mourning Becomes Electra.

In 1963, a television series based on the film was produced, starring Inger Stevens, Cathleen Nesbitt and William Windom.

Plot
Swedish-American Katie Holstrom (Loretta Young) leaves the family farm to attend nursing school in Capitol City.  Barn painter Adolph Petree (Rhys Williams), who completed a job for Katie's father, offers her a ride, then steals her money along the way. Katie, refusing to ask her family for help, goes to work as a maid for political power broker Agatha Morley (Ethel Barrymore) and her son, U.S. Representative Glenn Morley (Joseph Cotten). She impresses Agatha and her loyal butler Joseph Clancey (Charles Bickford) with her refreshing, down-to-earth common sense. Glenn is impressed with her other charms.

Unexpected problems arise when the Morleys and the other leaders of their political party have to select a replacement for a deceased congressman; they choose the unscrupulous Anders J. Finley (Art Baker). Knowing the man's true background, Katie strongly disapproves. At a public meeting to introduce Finley, Katie asks him pointed and embarrassing questions. Leaders of the opposition party are impressed and offer to back Katie in the coming election. Katie accepts and reluctantly quits her job, much to Glenn's disappointment.

When Katie's campaign gains support (with some coaching from Glenn), Finley smears her reputation by bribing Petree to claim Katie spent the night with him when he gave her a ride. Katie, distraught, runs home. When Glenn learns the truth, he follows her and proposes.

Agatha and Joseph get Finley drunk and he reveals he is a member of an extreme nativist political group  and that he bribed Petree, who is hidden away at his isolated lodge, to disparage Katie's reputation. Assisted by Katie's three burly brothers (James Arness, Lex Barker, Keith Andes), Glenn retrieves Petree from his goon guards, then forces him to confess over the radio. Agatha withdraws her party's support for Finley and endorses Katie, ensuring her election. In the final scene, Glenn carries Katie across the threshold of the United States House of Representatives.

Cast

In addition, Gus Stavros appears as a background extra in the film.

Production
Because of rumors that Joseph Cotten and Ingrid Bergman were having an affair, Bergman was replaced by Loretta Young.

Reception

Critical response
On Rotten Tomatoes, the film holds an approval rating of 100% based on seven reviews, with an average rating of 7.08/10.

Awards and nominations

References

External links
 
 
 
 The Farmer's Daughter on Lux Radio Theater: January 5, 1948

1947 films
American romantic comedy films
1940s political comedy films
1947 romantic comedy films
American political comedy films
American black-and-white films
American films based on plays
Films adapted into television shows
Films featuring a Best Actress Academy Award-winning performance
RKO Pictures films
Films directed by H. C. Potter
Films scored by Leigh Harline
1940s American films